Agrippinus may refer to:

Paconius Agrippinus, a stoic philosopher of the 1st century
Agrippinus of Alexandria, bishop of Alexandria in the 2nd century
Agrippinus of Carthage, bishop of Carthage during the 3rd century
Agrippinus of Autun, bishop of Autun; see Germain of Paris

Agrippinus of Naples (Agrippino, Arpinus), bishop of Naples in the 3rd century
 Agrippinus (magister militum), Roman general of the 5th century

See also
Agrippina (disambiguation), the female name of Agrippinus